Wildewoman is the second studio album by Brooklyn indie pop band Lucius. It was released on PIAS Recordings, Mom + Pop Music and Dine Alone Records to mostly positive reviews, drawing numerous comparisons to the girl groups of the 1960s. Reviewers also praised the album's eclectic mix of musical styles, as well as the vocal performances of lead singers Jess Wolfe and Holly Laessig. The album peaked at number 150 on the Billboard 200 chart.

Packaging and title
The album's cover artwork is a 1964 painting by Belgian pop artist Evelyne Axell, titled Ice Cream. In selecting the image, Wolfe and Laessig drew inspiration from other iconic, provocative album covers including Sticky Fingers and Nevermind. Laessig said "At the time, [Axell] was making a statement that was incredibly bold, and we think our show is bold, we’re strong women. There's nothing shy about the way that we sound and the way we put ourselves out there. It's a strong image. And if you’re looking at fifteen record covers on iTunes, what's going to stick out to you?"

The album title was taken from the song of the same name and was intended to evoke "free-spirited women". It is pronounced analogously to "wildebeest".

Reception

Critical
Wildewoman received generally positive reviews from critics, many of whom praised the vocal performances and girl group-inspired sound. In a review for Paste, Hilary Saunders wrote that the album was successful in "reintroducing retro girl-group swag to the 21st century at a time when it's most needed" and went on to call it "one of the most complete indie pop LPs this year". James Christopher Monger of AllMusic praised the album's fusion of styles and the "commanding performances" of Wolfe and Laessig, while Will Hermes' review for Rolling Stone described the album's sound as "fresh" and "thrilling". Writing for Consequence of Sound, Tony Hardy gave the album a more reserved assessment but noted that the band "spins some intriguing sounds".

Wildewoman also appeared on a number of year-end best album lists, including those compiled by Bob Boilen of NPR's All Songs Considered and the music staff at Amazon.com.

Commercial
The album debuted at No. 150 on the Billboard 200 album chart, with 3,000 copies sold in its first week. The album has sold 46,000 copies in the US as of March 2016.

Track listing
All songs written by Holly Laessig and Jess Wolfe unless otherwise noted.

"Wildewoman" – 4:11
"Turn It Around" – 3:28
"Go Home" – 3:19
"Hey, Doreen" – 4:41
"Tempest" – 4:09 (Laessig/Molad/Wolfe)
"Nothing Ordinary" – 3:01
"Two of Us on the Run" – 4:35
"Until We Get There" – 3:28 (Laessig/Molad/Wolfe)
"Don't Just Sit There" – 3:51
"Monsters" – 3:29
"How Loud Your Heart Gets" – 5:38

Personnel

Lucius
Jess Wolfe – Lead vocals
Holly Laessig – Lead vocals
Dan Molad – Drums
Peter Lalish – Guitar
Andrew Burri – Guitar

Additional musicians
Alan Hampton – Bass
Adam Christgau – Percussion
Gabriel Duncan – Guitar, Vocals
Jessica Martins – Backing vocals
Blake Mills – Guitar
Leital Molad – Backing vocals
Shelley Molad – Backing vocals
Chris Morrissey – Bass
Michaela Neller – Backing vocals
Sydney Price – Backing vocals
Rich Hinman – Guitar
Heather Robb – Backing vocals
Eric Robertson – Tenor guitar

Production
Lucius – production, engineering
Tony Berg – additional production
Steve Wall – additional production, engineering
Shawn Everett – engineering, mixing
Jacob Goldman – engineering
David Kahne – mixing
Bob Ludwig – mastering

Chart performance

References

2013 albums
Lucius (band) albums